Hyophorbe amaricaulis (also known as the "loneliest palm") is a species of palm tree of the order Arecales, family Arecaceae, subfamily Arecoideae, tribe Chamaedoreeae. It is found exclusively on the island of Mauritius, and only a single surviving specimen has been documented in the Curepipe Botanic Gardens in Curepipe. Thus, it is classified as an endling.

Distribution
This species is one of nine species of palm which are indigenous to Mauritius, and one of the seven palms which are also endemic.

In the 1700s, this palm species was described from specimens taken from the mountain Pieter Both, where it seems to have been widespread at the time.

Currently, only the single specimen exists in Curepipe Botanic Gardens, and it is not known if this specimen was planted here, or was a survivor from the area's wild population that became included when the gardens were established.

Description

The palm is about 12 meters high with a relatively thin gray trunk with a waxy crown shank.

It is related to the bottle palm and spindle palm. It is said to resemble the green variety of H. indica – another Hyophorbe palm species which also does not develop a swollen trunk.

It is reported to have white to cream-colored flowers on an inflorescence with three-ordered branching. Its fruits are 3.8 cm long and a dull red colour, but years and years of efforts have not resulted in fertile offspring.

References

Ian Parker, "Digging for Dodos", The New Yorker, January 22, 2007, pp. 64–73.
This article is based in part on the article in the German Wikipedia.

External links

amaricaulis
Endemic flora of Mauritius
Critically endangered plants
Endlings